The Massachusetts Burma Law was a law enacted in 1996 by the Massachusetts General Court limiting state entities from purchasing services from companies doing business with Myanmar (Burma). This law was enacted three months before the introduction of federal sanctions on trade with Burma.

A "restricted trade" list was compiled by the Commonwealth, which included 34 members of the National Foreign Trade Council (NFTC). The NFTC filed suit against Massachusetts' then Secretary of Administration and Finance, Stephen Crosby, in Crosby v. National Foreign Trade Council, arguing that the Massachusetts law infringed upon the federal government's foreign affairs and foreign commerce powers, and that it was already pre-empted by federal law. Massachusetts was also charged with violating the Supremacy Clause of the U.S. Constitution. The NFTC won the case with U.S. Supreme Court Justice David H. Souter ruling that "the state Act is preempted, and its application unconstitutional, under the Supremacy Clause."

The law was thus nullified.

See also 
Federalism
Supremacy Clause
 179th Massachusetts General Court (1995–1996)

References

External links
Crosby v. National Foreign Trade Council

Federalism in the United States
Massachusetts statutes
1996 in American law
1996 in Massachusetts
Myanmar–United States relations
Burma